Dutchy or Dutchie may refer to:

As a nickname
Gustave Ferbert (1873–1943), American football player and later head coach at the University of Michigan
Bob Holland (born 1946), Australian retired cricketer
Brodie Holland (born 1980), former Australian rules footballer
Jack Holland (rugby league) (1922–1994), Australian rugby league footballer
Patrick Holland (criminal) (died 2009), Irish career criminal
John Rademakers, first winner of the New Zealand NBL Kiwi MVP Award (in 1984), nicknamed "Dutchie"
Dylan Mulholland, a fictional character in the Australian TV series Sea Patrol

Other uses
Dutchy (Apache scout) (c. 1855–1893)
Dutchie (doughnut), a Canadian doughnut popularized by the Tim Hortons chain
Oliebol, a traditional Dutch and Belgian food commonly called a Dutchie in English
Dutch Masters (cigar), known colloquially as a "Dutchie"
Pass the Dutchie, 1982 song by British Jamaican reggae band Musical Youth
Kitchener-Waterloo Dutchmen (football), former Canadian football team (1953–1959) nicknamed the "Dutchies"
Dutchy (statue), a removed Confederate monument in Elberton, Georgia
Dutchie Butte – see List of mountains in Broadwater County, Montana
Dutchy Airport, a private airport in the Research Triangle, North Carolina
Dutchie, winner of the 1932 Edward Manifold Stakes Australian Thoroughbred horse race

See also
 Dutch (disambiguation)
Duchy

Lists of people by nickname